Copceac is a commune and village in the Gagauz Autonomous Territorial Unit of the Republic of Moldova.  The 2004 census listed the commune as having a population of 9,551 people.   Gagauz total 9,068. Minorities included 110 Moldovans, 97 Russians, 71 Ukrainians, 144 Bulgarians and 33 Roma.

Its geographical coordinates are 45° 51' 6" North, 28° 41' 33" East.

Notable people
  (1920–2014) - Romanian engineer and academic.

References

Copceac